Glen Ridge is a borough in Essex County, in the U.S. state of New Jersey. As of the 2020 United States census, the borough's population was 7,802, an increase of 275 (+3.7%) from the 2010 census count of 7,527, which in turn reflected an increase of 256 (+3.5%) from the 7,271 counted in the 2000 census.

History
In 1666, 64 Connecticut families led by Robert Treat bought land from the Lenni Lenape Native Americans and named it New Ark to reflect a covenant to worship freely without persecution. The territory included the future towns of Bloomfield, Montclair, Belleville and Nutley. When Bloomfield was established in 1812, Glen Ridge was a section "on the hill" composed mostly of farms and woodlands with the exception of a thriving industrial area along Toney's Brook in the glen. For most of the nineteenth century, three water-powered mills produced lumber, calico, pasteboard boxes and brass fittings. A copper mine and a sandstone quarry were located on the north side of the brook.

In 1856, the Newark and Bloomfield Railroad arrived, with the construction of the Glen Ridge station. In 1872, the New York and Greenwood Lake Railway arrived, with the construction of the station at today's Benson Street. Glen Ridge began its transition to a suburban residential community. Stately homes slowly replaced orchards and wooded fields.

In 1891, Mountainside Hospital, a local hospital with more than 300 beds now known as HackensackUMC Mountainside, was founded. The Glen Ridge Country Club was founded in 1894, making it one of the state's oldest clubs.

Residents "on the hill" became unhappy with their representation on the Bloomfield Council. In spite of repeated requests to Bloomfield officials, roads remained unpaved, water and sewer systems were nonexistent, and schools were miles away. Area residents marked out the boundaries of a  area to secede from the adjoining town. At the election held on February 12, 1895, the decision to secede passed by only 23 votes. Robert Rudd was elected the first mayor of Glen Ridge.

On February 13, 1895, Glen Ridge was incorporated as a borough by an act of the New Jersey Legislature from portions of Bloomfield Township, based on the results of a referendum held the previous day.

After becoming a borough, architects suggested buying gas lamps, they became a characteristic of the borough. Circa World War II, gas lamps were discarded, many by the City of New York, later salvaged, repaired, and brought to Glen Ridge. With only 3,000 gaslights remaining in operation in the entire United States, the 2,500 managed by Public Service Enterprise Group, succeeding the Welsbach Company, include 1,400 lamps in South Orange, 667 in Glen Ridge, some  
in Trenton and dozens of other towns, lighting their streets. The Gaslamp is the Glen Ridge Historical Society's quarterly newsletter.

In 1924, Glen Ridge became the first municipality in New Jersey to establish a zoning ordinance.

In 1982, the borough's official name was changed to "Township of Glen Ridge Borough". Glen Ridge was one of more than a dozen Essex County municipalities to reclassify themselves as townships to take advantage of federal revenue sharing policies that allocated townships a greater share of government aid on a per capita basis. Effective May 1993, the borough's original name of "Glen Ridge Borough" was restored. The borough's name comes from the ridge formed by Toney's Brook.

In 2010, Glen Ridge was ranked as the 38th Best Place to live by New Jersey Monthly magazine.

In 1989, athletes from the high school were involved in the sexual assault of a mentally handicapped student. Three teenagers were found guilty of first-degree aggravated sexual assault; a fourth was convicted of third-degree conspiracy. Author Bernard Lefkowitz wrote about the incident in the 1997 book Our Guys: The Glen Ridge Rape and the Secret Life of the Perfect Suburb. Lefkowitz's book was adapted into the 1999 TV movie Our Guys: Outrage at Glen Ridge.

Glen Ridge is a frequent location for film, television, and commercial shoots. Notable works include Winter Solstice and Mona Lisa Smile.

Geography
According to the United States Census Bureau, the borough had a total area of 1.28 square miles (3.31 km2), including 1.28 square miles (3.30 km2) of land and 0.01 square miles (0.01 km2) of water (0.39%). It is bounded by Bloomfield to its east, Montclair to its west, East Orange to its south, and shares a short border with Orange to its southwest. The borough's US mail ZIP code is 07028.

Glen Ridge is located on a ridge on the east side of the First Mountain of the Watchung Mountains. The town stretches  from north to south and a maximum of six blocks wide from east to west, and it is only three or two blocks wide in "the Panhandle" north of Bay Avenue.

Climate
Glen Ridge has a temperate climate, with warm / hot humid summers and cool / cold winters, according to the Köppen climate classification humid subtropical climate. Glen Ridge has 124 days of measurable precipitation a year. During the winter, it is highly recommended to wear warm clothing because it can get very cold, while the summers can get extremely hot and humid. The majority of February and a bit of March is when there are the most snowfall. Due to the town's elevation and the topography of its river banks, it is not prone to significant flooding.

There are typically about 205 sunny days per year in Glen Ridge. The temperature ranges from a high around 86 degrees in July and a low around 21 degrees in January. The comfort index for the town is 47 out of 100, compared to a national average of 44 (with higher numbers being more comfortable).

Demographics

2010 census

The Census Bureau's 2006–2010 American Community Survey showed that (in 2010 inflation-adjusted dollars) median household income was $160,511 (with a margin of error of ±$11,073) and the median family income was $173,466 (±$25,554). Males had a median income of $111,968 (±$11,975) versus $85,938 (±$24,626) for females. The per capita income for the borough was $64,222 (±$8,487). About 1.1% of families and 2.8% of the population were below the poverty line, including 1.9% of those under age 18 and none of those age 65 or over.

2000 census
As of the 2000 United States census there were 7,271 people, 2,458 households, and 1,978 families residing in the borough. The population density was 5,695.0 people per square mile (2,193.2/km2). There were 2,490 housing units at an average density of 1,950.3 per square mile (751.1/km2). The racial makeup of the borough was 89.18% White, 4.98% African American, 0.15% Native American, 3.34% Asian, 0.99% from other races, and 1.36% from two or more races. Hispanic or Latino of any race were 3.45% of the population.

There were 2,458 households, out of which 46.3% had children under the age of 18 living with them, 69.9% were married couples living together, 8.1% had a female householder with no husband present, and 19.5% were non-families. 16.7% of all households were made up of individuals, and 8.0% had someone living alone who was 65 years of age or older. The average household size was 2.95 and the average family size was 3.33.

In the borough, the population was spread out, with 30.7% under the age of 18, 4.5% from 18 to 24, 29.5% from 25 to 44, 24.9% from 45 to 64, and 10.4% who were 65 years of age or older. The median age was 38 years. For every 100 females, there were 94.9 males. For every 100 females age 18 and over, there were 89.3 males.

The median income for a household in the borough was $105,638, and the median income for a family was $120,650. Males had a median income of $91,161 versus $51,444 for females. The per capita income for the borough was $48,456. About 1.9% of families and 3.0% of the population were below the poverty line, including 3.3% of those under age 18 and 4.1% of those age 65 or over.

Government

Local government
Glen Ridge is governed under the Borough form of New Jersey municipal government, which is used in 218 municipalities (of the 564) statewide, making it the most common form of government in New Jersey. The governing body is comprised of the Mayor and the Borough Council, with all positions elected at-large on a partisan basis as part of the November general election. The Mayor is elected directly by the voters to a four-year term of office. The Borough Council is comprised of six members elected to serve three-year terms on a staggered basis, with two seats coming up for election each year in a three-year cycle. The Borough form of government used by Glen Ridge is a "weak mayor / strong council" government in which council members act as the legislative body with the mayor presiding at meetings and voting only in the event of a tie. The mayor can veto ordinances subject to an override by a two-thirds majority vote of the council. The mayor makes committee and liaison assignments for council members, and most appointments are made by the mayor with the advice and consent of the council.

, the mayor of Glen Ridge is Independent Stuart K. Patrick, whose term of office ends December 31, 2023. Members of the borough council are Council President Deborah Mans (I, 2023), Peter A. Hughes (I, 2022), Richard P. Law (I, 2022), David Lefkovits (I, 2023), Rebecca Meyer (I, 2024) and Ann Marie Morrow (I, 2024).

In January 2016, the borough council chose former mayor Peter Hughes to fill the council seat expiring in December 2016 that was vacated by Stuart K. Patrick, who resigned from the council to take his seat as mayor.

Murphy was selected by the borough council in November 2013 to serve the unexpired term of Elizabeth K. Baker. Ann Marie Morrow was elected in November 2014 to fill a one-year unexpired term.

The Glen Ridge Civic Conference Committee, established in 1913, is made up of delegates from the community and from local civic organizations, provides a non-partisan method of candidate selection for Borough elections. The CCC endorsement is very significant; in most elections, the CCC's candidates are unopposed. The eight organizations currently sending delegates to the CCC are: The Democratic Club, Freeman Gardens Association, Friends of the Glen Ridge Library, The Glen Ridge Historical Society, The Northside Association, The Republican Club, The Golden Circle, The South End Association and the Women's Club of Glen Ridge.

In recent years, the CCC has been weakened both by changing attitudes in the borough, the actions of a number of community residents, and internal conflicts within the CCC itself. Mayor Carl Bergmanson was the first mayor since the establishment of the CCC to be elected without seeking (or receiving) the Committee's endorsement. A member of the council for three terms, he ran for mayor in 1999, losing to the CCC candidate Steven Plate. When Plate was selected as the CCC candidate again in 2003 (contradicting the committee's precedent of one term per mayor), Bergmanson ran again, and won, gaining the majority in all but one of the town's districts. However, the CCC is still firmly in control of the town's political structure—all 16 of the elected officials currently serving Glen Ridge were nominated by the CCC. Generally, when non-CCC candidates run, they run as independents. The Democratic and Republican parties are not forces in local elections.

Federal, state, and county representation
Glen Ridge is located in the 11th Congressional District and is part of New Jersey's 28th state legislative district. 

Prior to the 2011 reapportionment following the 2010 Census, Glen Ridge had been in the 34th state legislative district.

Politics
As of March 2011, there were a total of 5,169 registered voters in Glen Ridge, of which 2,135 (41.3%) were registered as Democrats, 993 (19.2%) were registered as Republicans and 2,037 (39.4%) were registered as Unaffiliated. There were 4 voters registered as Libertarians or Greens.

In the 2012 presidential election, Democrat Barack Obama received 62.6% of the vote (2,415 cast), ahead of Republican Mitt Romney with 36.2% (1,396 votes), and other candidates with 1.1% (44 votes), among the 3,871 ballots cast by the borough's 5,380 registered voters (16 ballots were spoiled), for a turnout of 72.0%. In the 2008 presidential election, Democrat Barack Obama received 62.9% of the vote (2,583 cast), ahead of Republican John McCain with 35.2% (1,444 votes) and other candidates with 0.8% (33 votes), among the 4,104 ballots cast by the borough's 5,185 registered voters, for a turnout of 79.2%. In the 2004 presidential election, Democrat John Kerry received 59.1% of the vote (2,381 ballots cast), outpolling Republican George W. Bush with 39.9% (1,608 votes) and other candidates with 0.7% (35 votes), among the 4,031 ballots cast by the borough's 4,967 registered voters, for a turnout percentage of 81.2.

In the 2013 gubernatorial election, Republican Chris Christie received 53.2% of the vote (1,450 cast), ahead of Democrat Barbara Buono with 45.5% (1,240 votes), and other candidates with 1.2% (34 votes), among the 2,772 ballots cast by the borough's 5,429 registered voters (48 ballots were spoiled), for a turnout of 51.1%. In the 2009 gubernatorial election, Democrat Jon Corzine received 51.0% of the vote (1,388 ballots cast), ahead of Republican Chris Christie with 39.3% (1,071 votes), Independent Chris Daggett with 8.5% (231 votes) and other candidates with 0.7% (19 votes), among the 2,722 ballots cast by the borough's 5,144 registered voters, yielding a 52.9% turnout.

Education

The Glen Ridge Public Schools serve students in pre-kindergarten through twelfth grade. As of the 2018–19 school year, the district, comprised of four schools, had an enrollment of 1,899 students and 148.9 classroom teachers (on an FTE basis), for a student–teacher ratio of 12.8:1. Schools in the district (with 2018–19 enrollment data from the National Center for Education Statistics) are 
Forest Avenue School with 223 students in grades Pre-K–2, 
Linden Avenue School with 242 students in grades Pre-K–2, 
Ridgewood Avenue School with 575 students in grades 3–6 and 
Glen Ridge High School with 837 students in grades 7–12.

The high school was the 12th-ranked public high school in New Jersey out of 328 schools statewide in New Jersey Monthly magazine's September 2012 cover story on the state's "Top Public High Schools", after being ranked 4th in 2010 out of 322 schools listed.

Housing

The median price for a house in Glen Ridge in 2014 was $580,000, which is double the national average. Out of the 2,549 houses in the borough, 84.7% of them were single units (detached) and had a median of 7.7 rooms. Glen Ridge is known for its old town charm, with 72.8% of its houses having been built before 1939. In 1895, when the town was chartered, Glen Ridge became one of the first communities to hire a town planner which resulted in many late Victorian and Edwardian elements. The condition of the town has been maintained due to the building codes that were established, the creation of the Building Department which included a Building Inspector, and a zoning ordinance (the first in the state of New Jersey). Although the majority of Glen Ridge consists of houses, many residents  live in apartment complexes. One apartment complex is behind the Glen Ridge Community Pool, while the other apartment complex is not far from that.

The architecture of the borough includes houses representing every major style from the mid-nineteenth century onward. Some of the architecture styles include the Carpenter Gothic, the Medieval, the High Victorian Period, the Queen Anne Cottage, American Georgian, Shingle Style, and the Prairie Home Style. Notable architects that have left their legacy in the town include Frank Lloyd Wright, Stanford White, and John Russell Pope. To maintain the historical feel of the town and protect the architectural features, the town has created a Historic Preservation Commission which reviews construction on houses in the historic district. Many homes are included in the Glen Ridge Historic District, which was listed on the National Register of Historic Places (NRHP) in 1982 and later expanded in two boundary increases. It includes the Glen Ridge and the Benson Street train stations.

Transportation

Roads and highways

The primary roads directly serving Glen Ridge include County Route 506 (Bloomfield Avenue) and County Route 509. Major highways near the borough include the New Jersey Turnpike, Interstate 80, Interstate 280, the Garden State Parkway, U.S. Route 46, Route 3 and Route 21.

Public transportation
Glen Ridge is a little over a mile long, making it accessible for residents by walking or biking.

NJ Transit provides bus service to Newark on the 11, 28 and 29 via Bloomfield Avenue. Buses from DeCamp Bus Lines run to and from the Port Authority Bus Terminal in Midtown Manhattan.

Commuters can also take trains from the Glen Ridge station (formerly named Ridgewood Avenue), where NJ Transit provides service to Penn Station in Midtown Manhattan and to Hoboken Terminal via the Montclair-Boonton Line. There are many other train stations near Glen Ridge.

The town has a jitney service which provides transportation to and from the Glen Ridge Station for commuters. This service has a fee and is only available between certain hours in the day. The Freeman Parkway Bridge, constructed in 1926, is a deck arch bridge that crosses over Toney's Brook and the Montclair-Boonton Line.

Notable people

People who were born in, residents of, or otherwise closely associated with Glen Ridge include:

 Buzz Aldrin (born 1930), second person to walk on the Moon on Apollo 11
 Kurt Allerman (born 1955), former football linebacker who played nine seasons in the NFL for the St. Louis Cardinals Green Bay Packers and Detroit Lions
 Horace Ashenfelter (1923–2018), 1952 Olympic gold medalist in track and field
 Louis E. Baltzley (born 1885), inventor of the Binder clip
 Dale Berra (born 1956), former Major League Baseball player and son of Yogi Berra
 Charles W. Billings (1866–1928), politician and competitive shooter who was a member of the 1912 Summer Olympics American trapshooting team that won the gold medal in team clay pigeons
 Kerry Bishé (born 1984), movie and television actress who appeared in Argo and Scrubs
 Regina Bogat (born 1928), abstract artist
 Eddie Bracken (1915–2002), character actor
 Scott Bradley (born 1960), former MLB catcher
 Jon Brion (born 1963), singer, songwriter, composer and record producer
 Mark Bryant (born 1965), retired professional basketball player who played for 10 NBA teams during his career
 Salvador "Tutti" Camarata (1913–2005), composer, arranger, trumpeter and record producer
 Bill Casselman (born 1941), mathematician who works in group theory
 Kacy Catanzaro (born 1990), first woman to complete the qualifying course of American Ninja Warrior
 Mary Jo Codey (born 1955), former First Lady of New Jersey
 Tom Cruise (born 1962), movie star, spent several years of his childhood in Glen Ridge, and graduated from Glen Ridge High School
 Gary Cuozzo (born 1941), former quarterback who played in 10 NFL seasons from 1963 to 1972 for four teams
 David Demarest (born 1951), Vice President for Public Affairs, Stanford University and a former Republican operative who worked for Presidents Ronald Reagan and George H. W. Bush
 Marion Elza Dodd (1883–1961), bookseller, author, librarian and professor
 Michael J. Doherty (born 1963), Surrogate of Warren County, New Jersey, who served in the New Jersey Senate from 2009 to 2022.
 Joe Dubuque (born 1982), amateur wrestler and wrestling coach
 Lauren English (born 1989), competitive swimmer who set the United States Open Record in the 50 Meter Backstroke
 Cora Farrell (born 1999), curler who was a silver medalist at the 2016 Winter Youth Olympics
 Anthony Fasano (born 1984), NFL tight end for the Miami Dolphins
 Tom Fleming (1951–2017), distance runner who won the 1973 and 1975 New York City Marathon
 Buddy Fortunato (born 1946), newspaper publisher and politician who served four terms in the New Jersey General Assembly
 Kenny Garrett (born 1960), Grammy Award-winning jazz musician, saxophonist and composer
 Nia Gill (born 1948), represents the 34th Legislative District in the New Jersey Senate since 2002
 Sean Gleeson (born 1986), offensive coordinator and quarterbacks coach for the Rutgers Scarlet Knights football team
 Bill Guerin (born 1970), former NHL right winger who played for the New Jersey Devils, won two Stanley Cup championships, and represented the United States in the Olympics in 1998, 2002 and 2006
 Roger Lee Hall (born 1942), composer and musicologist
 Alfred Jensen (1903–1981), abstract painter
 Ezra Koenig (born 1984), musician Vampire Weekend
 Alexander Kolowrat (1886–1927), pioneer of Austrian Cinema
 Frederick Bernard Lacey (1920–2017), United States district judge of the United States District Court for the District of New Jersey
 Rodney Leinhardt (born 1970), professional wrestler, better known as Rodney from his appearances with the World Wrestling Federation
 Aubrey Lewis (1935–2001), football and track star with the Notre Dame Fighting Irish who was recognized by The Star-Ledger as its Football Player of the Century
 Rudy Mancuso (born 1992), actor, producer, internet personality, comedian and musician best known for his comedic videos on YouTube
 Katherine MacLean (1925–2019), science fiction author best known for her short fiction of the 1950s which examined the impact of technological advances on individuals and society
 Hugh McCracken (1942–2013), rock guitarist and session musician
 Wes Miles (born 1984), musician Ra Ra Riot
 Edward Page Mitchell (1852–1927), editor-in-chief of The New York Sun
 George Musser (born 1965), book author and contributing editor of Scientific American magazine
 William J. Nardini (born 1979), Assistant United States Attorney for the District of Connecticut and nominee to be a United States circuit judge of the United States Court of Appeals for the Second Circuit
 Gerry Niewood (1943–2009) jazz saxophonist
 Joe Orsulak (born 1962), Major League Baseball player from 1983 to 1997
 Robert A. Pascal (1934–2021), politician who served as County executive of Anne Arundel County, Maryland, from 1975 to 1982
 Barbara Rachelson, politician who has served in the Vermont House of Representatives since 2014
 Priscilla Roberts (1916–2001), artist known for her still life paintings
 Kathy Mueller Rohan, former professional tennis player
 Henry Selick (born 1952), stop motion director, producer and writer best known for directing both The Nightmare Before Christmas and James and the Giant Peach
 Cindy Sherman (born 1954), artistic photographer
 George Steinmetz (born 1957), exploration photographer, winner of the Picture of the Year award, Overseas Press Club, 25 stories for GEO magazine in Germany
 Alison Stewart (born 1966), MSNBC news personality and host of The Most with Alison Stewart
 Christian Thomas (born 1992), the son of Steve Thomas and the New York Rangers' 40th overall draft pick in 2010 who plays in the AHL for the Connecticut Whale
 Steve Thomas (born 1963), former NHL right winger who played for the New Jersey Devils from 1995 to 1998
 Stephen S. Trott (born 1939), judge for the United States Court of Appeals for the Ninth Circuit
 William Hazlett Upson (1891–1975), author best known stories featuring Alexander Botts, a salesman for the Earthworm Tractor Company
 Don Van Natta Jr. (born 1964), investigate reporter at The New York Times
 Tom Verducci (born 1960), sportswriter for Sports Illustrated
 Dick Zimmer (born 1944), former member of the United States House of Representatives who was the Republican candidate for United States Senate in 1996 and 2008

References

Further reading
 Lefkowitz, Bernard. Our Guys: The Glen Ridge Rape and the Secret Life of the Perfect Suburb.

External links

 Glen Ridge Borough Website
 Glen Ridge Public Schools Website
 Glen Ridge Illustrated History

 
1895 establishments in New Jersey
Borough form of New Jersey government
Boroughs in Essex County, New Jersey
Populated places established in 1895